Jerome Walters (9 April 1930 – 5 March 1998) was an American middle distance runner who competed in the 1956 Summer Olympics.

References

1930 births
1998 deaths
American male middle-distance runners
Olympic track and field athletes of the United States
Athletes (track and field) at the 1956 Summer Olympics
Athletes (track and field) at the 1959 Pan American Games
Pan American Games track and field athletes for the United States